Heino Dissing (16 September 1912 – 27 May 1990) was a Danish cyclist. He competed in the tandem event at the 1936 Summer Olympics.

References

External links
 

1912 births
1990 deaths
Danish male cyclists
Olympic cyclists of Denmark
Cyclists at the 1936 Summer Olympics
Cyclists from Copenhagen